40 Years: A Charlie Brown Christmas is a compilation album released in the U.S. by Peak Records in October 2005. The album is a tribute to the soundtrack album A Charlie Brown Christmas released by American jazz pianist Vince Guaraldi (credited to the Vince Guaraldi Trio) in December 1965.

Reception
Rob Theakston of AllMusic noted that the original soundtrack recording has become "a cornerstone for jazz orientation and an essential holiday remedy for the run-of-the-mill-predictable contemporary favorites," adding that the musicians assembled for this tribute album represent a "veritable who's who of adult contemporary and jazz performers." Theakston added that the resulting music is "very warm sounding, heavily polished" and "well-played". Vince Guaraldi historian Derrick Bang noted that the album is "quite nice", adding that David Benoit's rendition of "Christmas Is Coming" is a "punchy, swinging cover", while Dave Koz's version of "Linus and Lucy" is "equally lively". All About Jazz critic Woodrow Wilkins called the album a "jazz lover's delight".

Track listing

Session information
Credits adapted from CD liner notes.

"Christmas Is Coming"
Written by Vince Guaraldi
Piano, arranger: David Benoit
Drums: Vinnie Colaiuta
Cello: Dan Smith, Larry Corbett
Concert master: Joel Derouin
Contractor: Suzie Katayama
Copyist: Anna Stromberg, Eric Stonerook, Jenis Stonerook, William Stromberg
Percussion: Luis Conte
Trombone: Steven Holtman
Trumpet: Rick Baptist, Wayne Bergeron
Viola: Carole Mukogawa, Denyse Buffum
Violin: Haim Shtrum, John Wittenberg, Julian Hallmark, Laurence Greenfield, Ruth Bruegger

"Just Like Me"
Written by David Benoit, Lee Mendelson
Piano, bells, arranger: David Benoit
Drums: Vinnie Colaiuta
Vocals: Vanessa Williams
Cello: Dan Smith, Larry Corbett, Rudolph Stein
Concert master: Joel Derouin
Contractor: Suzie Katayama
Copyist: Caryn Rasmussen, Scott McRae-Capehart, Suzie Katayama
Engineer (vocals): Jan Folkson
Producer (vocals): Rob Mathes
Viola: Carole Mukogawa, Denyse Buffum, Karen Van Sant
Violin: Robert Peterson, Haim Shtrum, John Wittenberg, Julian Hallmark, Laurence Greenfield, Norman Hughes, Ruth Bruegger

"Linus and Lucy"
Written by Vince Guaraldi
Piano, synthesizer: David Benoit
Guitar: Tony Maiden
Electric bass: Alex Al
Alto Saxophone: Dave Koz
Drums: Vinnie Colaiuta
Percussion: Luis Conte

"It's the Most Wonderful Time of the Year"
Written by Edward Pola, George Wyle
Vocals: Toni Braxton
Piano, electric piano, synthesizer, arranger: David Benoit
Guitar: Grant Geissman
Acoustic bass: Dave Carpenter
Drums: John Robinson
Engineer (assistant vocal engineer]: Mack Woodward
Producer (vocals): Keri Lewis

"My Little Drum"
Written by Vince Guaraldi
Electric piano: David Benoit
Guitar: Tony Maiden
Electric bass: Alex Al
Flugelhorn: Rick Braun
Drums: Vinnie Colaiuta
Percussion: Luis Conte

"Skating"
Written by Vince Guaraldi
Electric piano, arranger: David Benoit
Guitar: Norman Brown
Acoustic bass: Alex Al
Drums: Vinnie Colaiuta

"Christmas Time Is Here"
Written by Vince Guaraldi, Lee Mendelson
Vocals, arranger, producer: Brian McKnight
Piano: David Benoit
Keyboards: David Nathan
Guitar: Tyrone Chase
Bass: Chris Loftlin
Acoustic bass: Dave Carpenter
Drums: Prescott Ellison, Peter Erskine
Engineer: Chris Wood

"O Tannenbaum"
Written by Ernst Anschütz
Electric piano, arranger: David Benoit
Guitar: Tony Maiden
Electric bass: Alex Al
Tenor saxophone: Gerald Albright
Drums: Vinnie Colaiuta
Percussion: Luis Conte

"Red Baron"
Written by Vince Guaraldi
Guitar, keyboards, arranger, producer: Russ Freeman
Keyboards: Bill Heller
Saxophone: Eric Marienthal
Drums: Peter Erskine
Engineer: Steve Sykes

"The Christmas Song"
Written by Mel Tormé, Robert Wells
Vocals: Chaka Khan
Piano, electric piano, synthesizer, arranger: David Benoit
Acoustic bass: Dave Carpenter
Drums: John Robinson
Percussion: Luis Conte

"Für Elise"
Written by Ludwig van Beethoven
Piano: David Benoit

"Christmas Time Is Here" (reprise)
Written by Vince Guaraldi
Piano: David Benoit
Acoustic bass: Dave Carpenter
Saxophone: Eric Marienthal
Drums: Peter Erskine

Additional personnel
Producer: David Benoit (Tracks 1–6, 8, 10–12)
A&R coordinator: Valerie Ince
Art direction: Abbey Anna
Production coordinator: Yvonne Wish
Design: Andrew Pham
Engineer (second): Brian Vibberts, George Gumbs, Jeff Wakolbinger, Josh Blanchard
Engineer (mix): Clark Germain (Tracks 1–8, 10–12)
Engineer (tracking): Clark Germain (Tracks 1–8, 10–12)
Executive producer: Andi Howard, Mark Wexler, Ron Moss
Mixing: WonderWorld Studio, Los Angeles, California
Mastering: Bernie Grundman Mastering, Hollywood, California

References

2005 albums
David Benoit (musician) albums
Peanuts music
Christmas albums by American artists
Jazz Christmas albums
Soundtrack compilation albums
Vince Guaraldi tribute albums